High School Hero may refer to:

High School Hero (1927 film), 1927 film directed by David Butler
High School Hero (1946 film), 1946 film directed by Arthur Dreifuss